CHRW may refer to:

 CHRW-FM, a radio station (94.9 FM) licensed to London, Ontario, Canada
 C. H. Robinson Worldwide (NASDAQ symbol CHRW)